Grace Wynne Griffith born Grace Roberts (February 1888 – 1 May 1963) was a Welsh novelist writing in Welsh. She won a joint prize at the National Eisteddford in 1934.

Life 
Griffith was born in Newborough in February 1888 and educated at Ysgol Syr Hugh Owen. She was a nurse in Liverpool. She wrote her novel Creigiau Milgwyn. The book was awarded a prize at the National Eisteddford in Neath in 1934. She won the prize jointly with Kate Roberts who had written Traed mewn cyffion (Feet in Chains), which reflected the hard life of a slate-quarrying family.  However it was alleged that Griffith's novel Creigiau Milgwyn was unworthy of the prize according to the academic T.J. Morgan. Morgan blamed the historian Thomas Richards who had been the judge.

Private life 
She met the Rev. Griffith W. Griffith and they married in 1914. He was a noted biographer and they had three children including the biographer the Rev. Huw Wynne Griffith.

References 

1888 births
1963 deaths
People from Anglesey
Welsh novelists